Keith Shumate is an American baseball coach and former player, who is the head baseball coach of the Norfolk State Spartans. He played college baseball at Western Carolina from 1985 to 1988. He served as the head coach of the North Carolina A&T Aggies (1997–2011) and the Louisburg Hurricanes (2013–2015).

Playing career
Shumate was a player for the Western Carolina Catamounts baseball program from 1985 to 1988.

Coaching career
From 1994 to 1996, Shumate was the head coach at Grimsley High School in Greensboro, North Carolina.

After going 89–216 in his first 5 seasons, Shumate was unsure that he would be able to keep his job under new athletic's director, Charlie Davis, but just two seasons later he led the Aggies to their first MEAC championship in 12 years. On April 19, 2011, Shumate announced that he would be resigning at the end of the season.

Shumate stepped away from his coaching career in 2015 to watch his son's final two seasons of college baseball.

On July 18, 2012, Shumate was named the head coach of Louisburg College.

On August 25, 2017, Shumate was hired as an assistant coach by the Norfolk State Spartans baseball program. On September 28, 2017, Shumate was named the interim head coach after head coach Claudell Clark resigned.

Head coaching record

See also
 List of current NCAA Division I baseball coaches

References

External links

Norfolk State Spartans bio

Living people
Western Carolina Catamounts baseball players
High school baseball coaches in the United States
North Carolina A&T Aggies baseball coaches
Louisburg Hurricanes baseball coaches
Norfolk State Spartans baseball coaches
Year of birth missing (living people)
Kansas City Royals scouts
Baseball coaches from North Carolina